Yaroslav II Iziaslavich (died 1180?), Prince of Turov (1146), Novgorod (1148–1154), Lutsk (1154–1180) and Grand Prince of Kiev (Kyiv, 1174–1175, 1180). He was the son of Iziaslav II of Kiev and Agnes Hohenstaufen and the brother of Mstislav II of Kiev.

Biography
After the murder of Andrey Bogolyubsky, Yaroslav's relatives managed to maneuver him into the Kievan throne. He contended with a senior relative, Sviatoslav Vsevolodivich, for over two years before Sviatoslav eventually won power for himself and became the uncontested ruler of Kiev.

Family
He was married to Richeza, daughter Vladislaus II, King of Bohemia.
 Ingvar Yaroslavich (?-1220), prince of Lutsk (1180-1220), Grand Prince of Kiev (1201-1202, 1203, 1204)
 Vsevolod Yaroslavich (?-1209)
 Iziaslav Yaroslavich (?-1195)
 Mstislav the Mute (?-1226)
 Ivan, prince of Lutsk and Chartoryisk

Sources
Martin, Janet L.B. Medieval Russia, 980-1584, 1995 (Cambridge Medieval Textbooks)

Rurik dynasty
1180 deaths
Grand Princes of Kiev
12th-century princes in Kievan Rus'
Eastern Orthodox monarchs
Year of birth unknown
Izyaslavichi family (Volhynia)